Palaio Faliro B.C. (alternate spelling: Paleo Falirou) (Greek: Παλαιού Φαλήρου) is a Greek professional basketball club. The team is located in Palaio Faliro, Athens, Greece. The club has competed in the Greek Second Division. The club's full name is Athlitikos Omilos Palaio Falirou (Αθλητικός Όμιλος Παλαιού Φαλήρου), which is abbreviated as A.O.P.F. (Α.O.Π.Φ.).

History
Palaio Faliro's parent athletic sports club was founded in 1926, with the athletic union's first sporting department being the football club. In 1928, the athletic union added the track and field section, and in 1929, it added swimming and volleyball sections. The basketball club was added in 1931, after the athletic union decided to abandon the football club, in favor of a basketball department.

Arena
Palaio Faliro plays its home games at the Sofia Befon Palaio Faliro Indoor Hall. The seating capacity of the arena is 1,204 people.

Division history

Men's team
1995–96: South Attica ESKANA Regional Championship
1996–97: Third National (4th-tier)
1997–98: Second National (3rd-tier)
1998–2005: A2 Division
2005–06: Second National
2006–08: A2 Division
2008–09: Second National
2009–11: Third National
2011–12: South Attica (ESKANA) Premier Division
2012–13: South Attica (ESKANA) Second Level

Rankings
2002–03 Greek 2nd Division: 2nd
2007–08 Greek 2nd Division: 15th (7 wins, 23 losses and 30 games) - relegated
2009–10 Third National - Group 1 South: 5th
2010–11 Third National - Group 2 South: 13th (3 wins, 22 losses and 1 tie) - relegated
2012–13: South Attica (ESKANA) Second Division: 6th

Result history
1996: South Attica (ESKANA) Cup: tied with Alimos
1997: South Attica (ESKANA) Cup: defeated Alimos
1999: Greek Cup, Round of 8: Aris - Paleo Faliro: 76–48

Achievements

Men's team
Third Division (1):
2006
Fourth Division (2):
1997, 2020
ESKANA South Attica Cup (1):
1997

Women's team
Greek Women's League (2)
1975, 1982

Notable players

 Giannis Kalampokis
 Lazaros Agadakos
 Ioannis Gagaloudis
 Leonidas Skoutaris
 Christoforos Stefanidis

Former presidents
 Giorgos Velissarakos (1990s)
 Kostas Sorotos (2000s)

References

External links
Official Website 
Eurobasket.com Team Page

Basketball teams in Greece
Basketball teams established in 1931